Gustavo Gabriel Tejería (born 30 January 1981) was an Uruguayan footballer. 

He was part of Chilean side Everton's 2008 Torneo Apertura winner squad.

Honours

Club
Everton
Primera División de Chile (1): 2008 Apertura

References
 BDFA Profile 
 Profile at Tenfield Digital 

1981 births
Living people
Uruguayan footballers
Rampla Juniors players
Cerro Largo F.C. players
Sportivo Cerrito players
Everton de Viña del Mar footballers
Uruguayan expatriate footballers
Expatriate footballers in Chile
Uruguayan expatriate sportspeople in Chile
Association football midfielders
Footballers from Paysandú